Silent Cinema (1895-1930) is an English language non-fiction book written by Pasupuleti Purnachandra Rao. It won the National Film Award for Best Book on Cinema.

References

Indian non-fiction books
English-language books